Satellite Collective is a non-profit, multi-medium artist collective based in New York City and led by Kevin Draper. Functioning as an “arts incubator”, Satellite Collective generates accessible creative opportunities for artists in the performing and visual arts. Satellite Collective builds global artist coalitions to achieve innovative art exhibitions, structured by intersecting diverse mediums of art. Contributing artists of Satellite Collective are writers, poets, composers, musicians, choreographers, dancers, digital artists, photographers, and designers whose collaborative projects emerge as multimedia ballet performances, a musician ensemble, and an online periodical. Satellite Collective has received press attention from The New York Times and The New Yorker.

Projects

Satellite Ballet
Satellite Ballet was founded in 2010 by Kevin Draper and Troy Schumacher after they met by chance at their apartment building in New York City and began to create an experimental ballet. Draper's surrealistic poetry served as the interpretative foundation of Schumacher's choreography, an unconventional technique that transcended the typical method of developing choreography based on a piece of music. Draper then introduced Schumacher to composer Nick Jaina, who had previously performed at Draper's art venue in Michigan. Soon after, the three artists began collaborating with other artists on the ballet project: these artists became the founding artists of the Satellite Ballet. The founding artists agreed to an egalitarian structure in which all the artists and their diverse mediums of art were equal and deserved equal representation in projects. For the first few years, the artists collaborated under the name Satellite Ballet but after Schumacher split from Satellite Ballet in 2013 to begin his own company, Satellite Collective reformed under new choreographers and performs under the name Satellite Collective.

Satellite Collective Performing Arts

Satellite Collective is a multi-medium exhibitive branch of the artist collective creating dance, literary works of poetry and librettos, musical compositions (Satellite Ensemble), digital art, film, photography, and spoken word. The collaborative process is very much present during the development of new works as artists employ technology to exchange ideas, concepts, and ideas. New dance, music, short film, multimedia, and spoken word projects are created each year by Satellite Collective, and these projects are first previewed through the Satellite Summer Residency at the Dogwood Center for Performing Arts in Fremont, Michigan; premiere performances are held in New York City – a seasonal structure established in earlier years with the Satellite Ballet. Satellite Collective has performed at Brooklyn Academy of Music and in 2014 as well as 2015, Satellite Collective was selected by the BAM/Devos Institute of Arts Management at Kennedy Center for the professional development program of Brooklyn Academy of Music.

Satellite Press Publishing and Transmission Magazine

Satellite Press is an independent publisher that promotes artistic literary publications reflective of collaborative efforts between artists and authors of prose, poetry, and visual art. Serving as the literary effort of Satellite Collective, Satellite Press publishes book length eBooks of both prose and poetry. Satellite Press publications are productions of a wide variety of collaborating artists - painters, filmmakers, sculptors, musicians, and photographers. Through unique interpretations of text, artists create artistic responses that contribute to the final publications.  The Transmission Journal is an international online arts periodical dedicated to the conversation between artists and writers. Contributors to the Transmission Online Periodical include nationally reputable writers including Roy Scranton, Matt Gallagher, and Pedro Ponce.

Telephone International Arts Experiment

"Telephone" is an international arts exchange that globally joins artists. The program is curated and directed for Satellite Collective by Nathan Langston. This project operates much like the game telephone: artists of various mediums interpret the work of other artists with their own work, passing a single message from art form to art form. Telephone received international press coverage upon launch, driven by the global profile of its participating artists. W.J.T. Mitchell, speaking of the Telephone Game in the New York Times, noted that Telephone “is basically a performance of something that every artist already knows, which is that art is not made in solitude; it’s made out of other art.” The New York Times indicated that although experiments in linking artists are not new, it has seldom been done at this scale.

Satellite Film

In 2012 Satellite began incorporating short film, video and stop motion animation into live performances. Satellite's first major short film, "Twin Star Event," was premiered by the Grand Rapids Art Museum (GRAM) for ArtPrize in 2014.

Methods and processes

Satellite Collective produces projects by creating teams of artists who utilize collaboration directly on works with equal billing regardless of the core arts vertical in which the finished work may be categorized. This has challenged reviewers of the organization's performances, some of whom have argued that the individual art forms deserve singular focus and that the mixed form is perplexing, while others have argued that the mixed art forms are competing for attention. For instance, Creative Director Kevin Draper's projections have been called both "tacked on" and "intriguing". A typical performance of the Satellite Collective Performing Arts includes music, dance, spoken word, short film, multimedia and experimental lighting.

Works
From various sources.

Official Links
Official Website

References

American artist groups and collectives
Dance organizations
Film organizations in the United States
Music organizations based in the United States
Architecture organizations based in the United States
Arts organizations based in New York City
Visual arts magazines published in the United States